Luc Sanders (born 6 October 1945 in Bruges) is a retired Belgian footballer. During his career he played for Cercle Brugge K.S.V., Club Brugge K.V., V.G. Oostende, and K.A.A. Gent. He earned 1 cap for the Belgium national football team, and participated in UEFA Euro 1972.

Honours

Player 

 Club Brugge

 Belgian First Division: 1972–73
 Belgian Cup: 1969–70
 Jules Pappaert Cup: 1972

International

Belgium 

 UEFA European Championship:Third place: 1972,

References
Royal Belgian Football Association: Number of caps

1945 births
Living people
Footballers from Bruges
Belgian footballers
Belgium international footballers
UEFA Euro 1972 players
Cercle Brugge K.S.V. players
Club Brugge KV players
K.A.A. Gent players
Belgian Pro League players
Association football goalkeepers
Belgian football managers
K.V. Oostende managers